Marcos Victor Ferreira da Silva (born 26 December 2001), known as Marcos Victor, is a Brazilian professional footballer who plays as a central defender for Bahia.

Club career
Born in Fortaleza, Ceará, Marcos Victor represented hometown sides Ferroviário and Floresta as a youth. He made his first team debut with the latter on 21 January 2021, starting in a 0–4 away loss against Icasa for the 2020 Copa Fares Lopes.

In February 2021, Marcos Victor joined Ceará and returned to the under-20 team. His loan was extended for seven months on 28 December of that year, and he was subsequently promoted to the main squad on 6 January 2022.

Marcos Victor made his first team debut with Vozão on 1 February 2022, starting in a 1–0 Copa do Nordeste away win over Sergipe. He made his Série A debut on 14 May, playing the full 90 minutes in a 2–2 home draw against Flamengo.

On 30 June 2022, Marcos Victor signed a permanent contract with Ceará until June 2025. On 18 December, after the club's relegation, he signed a five-year deal with Bahia.

Career statistics

References

External links
 Ceará official profile 

2001 births
Living people
Sportspeople from Fortaleza
Brazilian footballers
Association football defenders
Campeonato Brasileiro Série A players
Floresta Esporte Clube players
Ceará Sporting Club players
Esporte Clube Bahia players